Humberto Dávila Esquivel (born 6 February 1939) is a Mexican politician from the New Alliance Party. From 2006 to 2009 he served as Deputy of the LX Legislature of the Mexican Congress representing Coahuila.

References

1939 births
Living people
Politicians from Coahuila
New Alliance Party (Mexico) politicians
21st-century Mexican politicians
Deputies of the LX Legislature of Mexico
Members of the Chamber of Deputies (Mexico) for Coahuila